The 1968 Missouri lieutenant gubernatorial election was held on November 5, 1968. Democratic nominee William S. Morris defeated Republican nominee Lem T. Jones Jr. with 56.97% of the vote.

Primary elections
Primary elections were held on August 6, 1968.

Democratic primary

Candidates
William S. Morris, Public Administrator of Jackson County
Edward L. Dowd
John E. Down, State Senator
James W. "Jim" Shaffer
Bill Beeny
Daniel Preston Williams
Bill Bangert
Scott Ousley

Results

Republican primary

Candidates
Lem T. Jones Jr., State Senator
George R. Hart
James Pirtle

Results

General election

Candidates
William S. Morris, Democratic
Lem T. Jones Jr., Republican

Results

References

1968
Gubernatorial
Missouri